Wellington ministry may refer to:

 First Wellington ministry, the British government led by the Duke of Wellington from 1828 to 1830
 Second Wellington ministry, the British government led by the Duke of Wellington from November to December 1834